Dyschirius varidens is a species of ground beetle in the subfamily Scaritinae. It was described by Fall in 1910.

References

varidens
Beetles described in 1910